Sausage and peppers is a dish in Italian-American cuisine prepared using Italian sausage and peppers (such as bell peppers) as primary ingredients. It is served as a dish on its own, sometimes with the use of additional ingredients such as tomato sauce, onions and pasta, and is sometimes served in the form of a sandwich. Some Italian delicatessens in the United States prepare and serve sausage and peppers, and it is a common dish at the Feast of San Gennaro, where it was first served back in 1927, Italian street festivals, feasts and events in the United States.

See also

 List of sausage dishes

References

External links
 https://www.epicurious.com/recipes/food/views/fried-peppers-onions-and-sausages-2184

Italian-American cuisine
Sausage dishes
Italian-American culture in New York City
Cuisine of New York City
Culture of New York City
Food combinations